Partners in Crime is a short (9 minutes) 1942 British propaganda film, which delivers a stern reprimand to housewives meddling in the black market. It is notable in that it was directed by Sidney Gilliat and Frank Launder.

Although unavailable on home video, it can be freely viewed in the UK at any of the British Film Institute's Mediatheques.

References

External links

1942 short films
1942 films
British short films
Films directed by Frank Launder
Films directed by Sidney Gilliat
British comedy films
1942 comedy films
British black-and-white films
1940s British films